The Vâjiștea is a left tributary of the river Teleorman in Romania. It discharges into the Teleorman in the village Teleormanu.

References

Rivers of Romania
Rivers of Teleorman County